Hajji Kola-ye Olya (also Romanized as Ḩājjī Kolā-ye ‘Olyā; also known as Ḩājjī Kolā-ye Bālā) is a village in Dabuy-ye Shomali Rural District, Sorkhrud District, Mahmudabad County, Mazandaran Province, Iran. At the 2006 census, its population was 440, in 126 families.

References 

Populated places in Mahmudabad County